Theoneste Begumisa Safari is a Rwandan politician, currently a member of the Chamber of Deputies in the Parliament of Rwanda.

References 

Members of the Chamber of Deputies (Rwanda)
Living people
Year of birth missing (living people)